Vakaippathi, one among the Panchappathis is a holy site for the People of Ayyavazhi. 

Vakaippathi is the place situated 4 km northeast to Kanyakumari in the seashore near vattakkotai. This is the place where 700 families from Swamithoppe were sent to Thuvayal Thavasu by Ayya Vaikundar; they were later known as Thuvayal Pantarams. This pathi is not included in Pancha pathis.

See also
Hindu gods
Ayyavazhi mythology
List of Ayyavazhi-related articles

Ayyavazhi
Religious places